National Tertiary Route 726, or just Route 726 (or ) is a National Road Route of Costa Rica, located in the Alajuela province.

Description
In Alajuela province the route covers Naranjo canton (San Juan, Palmitos districts).

References

Highways in Costa Rica